The Tampa Bay area is home to many sports teams and has a substantial history of sporting activity. Most of the region's professional sports franchises use the name "Tampa Bay", which is the name of a body of water, not of any city. This is to emphasize that they represent the wider metropolitan area and not a particular municipality and was a tradition started by Tampa's first major sports team, the original Tampa Bay Rowdies, when they were founded in 1975.

Three teams compete in the four major leagues. The Tampa Bay Buccaneers play in the National Football League (NFL), the Tampa Bay Lightning play in the National Hockey League (NHL), and the Tampa Bay Rays play in Major League Baseball (MLB). Additionally, six MLB teams hold their spring training camps in the area.

A number of minor league franchises play in the region as well, including the Tampa Bay Vipers of the XFL, Tampa Bay Rowdies of the United Soccer League, and five minor league baseball teams competing in Low-A Southeast.

In intercollegiate sports, the University of South Florida Bulls compete in NCAA Division I, while Eckerd College, Saint Leo University and the University of Tampa compete in NCAA Division II.

Between September 2020 and July 2021 all three of Tampa Bay's major teams, as well as the Tampa Bay Rowdies, qualified for their sport's championship series at least once. The Lightning beat the Dallas Stars in the 2020 Stanley Cup Finals, the Rays won the AL Pennant, that got them classified for the 2020 World Series which they lost to the Los Angeles Dodgers, the Rowdies and Phoenix Rising FC were named co-league champions after the USL Championship game was canceled due to COVID-19, the Buccaneers beat the Kansas City Chiefs in Super Bowl LV, and the Lightning beat the Montreal Canadiens in the 2021 Stanley Cup Finals. This dynasty earned the area the nickname "Champa Bay".

Traditions

"Tampa Bay" 
The name "Tampa Bay" is often used to describe a geographic metropolitan area which encompasses the cities around the body of water known as Tampa Bay, including Tampa, St. Petersburg, Clearwater and several smaller cities. Unlike in the case of Green Bay, Wisconsin, there is no municipality known as "Tampa Bay", and the "Tampa Bay" in the names of local professional sports franchises, such as the Buccaneers, Lightning, Rays, Rowdies, and the former Storm and Mutiny, denotes that they represent the entire region, not just the city of Tampa.

Fans in the area have a popular call-and-response chant that goes beyond just sports and into everyday life. The leader of the chant yells "Tampa" and others respond with "Bay". At games, one side of the stadium or arena will yell each word.

Boat parades 
Since 2020, when a Tampa-based team is crowned as the champions of their league, the team will have a parade of boats down the Hillsborough River rather than a traditional victory parade through the streets like in other cities. This started after the Lightning won the 2020 Stanley Cup and the Buccaneers won Super Bowl LV as a way to celebrate the teams while remaining socially distant in the wake of the COVID-19 pandemic, but was continued after the Lightning won the Stanley Cup again in 2021 even though COVID restrictions had been relaxed.

Major professional sports teams

Current teams 

The Tampa Bay area has seen five championships among their three teams in the four major sports. The Tampa Bay Buccaneers won Super Bowl XXXVII in 2002 against the Oakland Raiders by a score of 48–21 and Super Bowl LV in 2020 against the Kansas City Chiefs by a score of 31–9. The Tampa Bay Lightning won the 2004 Stanley Cup Finals by beating the Calgary Flames in seven games, the 2020 Stanley Cup Finals by beating the Dallas Stars in six games, and the 2021 Stanley Cup Finals by beating the Montreal Canadiens in five games. The Bucs also reached the NFC Championship Game in the 1979 and 1999 seasons, both times being beaten by the Los Angeles/St. Louis Rams. The Lightning lost in the 2015 Finals against the Chicago Blackhawks and in the 2022 Finals against the Colorado Avalanche, along with playing in the 2011, 2016 and 2018 Conference Finals, each of which went to seven games. The Tampa Bay Rays played the 2008 World Series before losing to the Philadelphia Phillies in five games, and in the 2020 World Series, losing to the Los Angeles Dodgers in six games.

Football 

Professional football first arrived in the Tampa Bay area in 1964, when the American Football League staged an exhibition game between the Buffalo Bills and the New York Jets. Five years later, the Miami Dolphins and the Minnesota Vikings faced off in a joint AFL-NFL preseason game prior to the 1969 season, the final one before the two leagues would merge.
 
The Tampa Bay Buccaneers of the NFL began play in old Tampa Stadium in 1976 as an expansion team. After losing an NFL-record 26 straight games to begin their existence, the Bucs reached the 1979 NFC Championship game only to sink back into futility with an NFL-record 14 straight losing seasons through the 1980s and early 1990s.

The franchise's fortunes began a turnaround in the mid-90s under coach Tony Dungy, and the success continued after the team moved into newly built Raymond James Stadium in 1998. The upward trend culminated in the Bucs' first championship at the end of the 2002 season under coach Jon Gruden, when they defeated the Oakland Raiders in Super Bowl XXXVII. The Bucs made several playoff appearances since then but didn't win another playoff game until the 2020 season, in which they reached Super Bowl LV and defeated the Kansas City Chiefs for their second title. Bruce Arians became the Bucs' head coach beginning with the 2019 season.

Baseball

Tampa Bay Rays

Minor league, amateur, and spring training baseball have long been very popular in the Tampa Bay area. As such, a fierce cross-bay competition for a potential Major League Baseball franchise developed in the 1980s and 1990s, with Tampa and St. Petersburg each vying to bring professional baseball to town. Despite warnings from MLB that expansion was not imminent, St. Pete began construction of the Florida Suncoast Dome in 1987 in the hopes of eventually landing an MLB team through expansion or relocation.

Many teams, including the Oakland A's, Texas Rangers, Seattle Mariners, Chicago White Sox, Minnesota Twins, and San Francisco Giants, considered moving to the vacant venue. Local investors actually bought part ownership of the Twins and, in another attempt, had an agreement to buy the Giants and bring them to St. Pete. However, for various reasons, all these attempts to bring major league baseball to the area fell short.

Tampa Bay was rumored to be a front-runner when MLB expanded by two teams in 1991, but Miami and Denver were chosen instead. Finally, in March 1995, St. Petersburg was awarded a major league expansion franchise along with Phoenix.

The Tampa Bay Rays began play as the Tampa Bay Devil Rays in newly renamed Tropicana Field in 1998. The franchise struggled through its first 10 years of existence, finishing last in the American League East Division in nine of those ten seasons. After (again) posting the worst record in baseball in 2007, however, the newly renamed "Rays" won 97 games in 2008, winning the AL East and the AL pennant to earn a berth in the 2008 World Series under manager Joe Maddon. Since 2008 inclusive, the Rays have won three AL East titles and have made six playoff appearances, as well as a second World Series appearance in 2020. Kevin Cash has been the Rays' manager since 2015.

Spring training and minor leagues 
The area has had a long association with spring training baseball. The local tradition began in 1913, when the Chicago Cubs, lured by Tampa mayor D.B. McKay's pledge to pay the team's expenses, trained at Plant Field. St. Petersburg mayor Al Lang made a similar push, and in 1914, the St. Louis Browns became the first of many teams to train in St. Pete, being succeeded by the Philadelphia Phillies for 1915. The Phillies used a new facility called "Coffee Pot Bayou Park" along the city's bayfront area. In the 1940s, a small modern ballpark was built on the site. It would be christened Al Lang Field in honor of the mayor who had brought baseball to St. Petersburg.

Many major league teams have trained in the Tampa Bay area over the ensuing decades. Current members of the spring training Grapefruit League include:
The Baltimore Orioles at Ed Smith Stadium in Sarasota
The New York Yankees at George M. Steinbrenner Field in Tampa
The Philadelphia Phillies at Spectrum Field in Clearwater
The Pittsburgh Pirates at McKechnie Field in Bradenton
The Toronto Blue Jays at TD Ballpark in Dunedin
The Detroit Tigers at Joker Marchant Stadium in Lakeland

The area also hosts five minor league baseball teams, all in Low-A Southeast. These teams all use stadiums also used by MLB teams for spring training. These teams are:
The Clearwater Threshers (Phillies): Spectrum Field in Clearwater
The Dunedin Blue Jays: TD Ballpark in Dunedin
The Bradenton Marauders (Pirates): McKechnie Field in Bradenton
The Tampa Tarpons (Yankees): George M. Steinbrenner Field in Tampa
The Lakeland Flying Tigers: Joker Marchant Stadium in Lakeland

Historical teams 
Several other local minor league teams have come and gone over the years. Notable historical teams include:
The Tampa Smokers – The area's first modern professional baseball team (1919), charter member of the original Florida State League (FSL)
The St. Petersburg Saints – Founded in 1920, also played in the FSL
The Tampa Tarpons – Long-time FSL affiliate of the Cincinnati Reds, alumni include several members of the "Big Red Machine"
The Tampa Rockets – Local affiliate in the Florida State Negro League during the 1940s

Hockey 

The NHL's Tampa Bay Lightning were established as an expansion franchise in 1992. They began play in the Florida State Fairgrounds' Expo Hall in Tampa, then moved across the Bay to what is now Tropicana Field in St. Petersburg (which was rechristened the "Thunderdome" at the time), and finally found a permanent home ice in the new Amalie Arena (originally known as the "Ice Palace"), located in the Channelside District of downtown Tampa. The Lightning have won three Stanley Cup championships: in 2004, 2020, and 2021. They have been coached by Jon Cooper since 2013.

College sports
The Tampa Bay Area is home to four colleges and universities which compete in NCAA sports.

University of South Florida

The University of South Florida Bulls compete in NCAA Division I, the highest level of college sports. USF opened in north Tampa in 1960 and started its sports program in 1965 with a men's soccer squad. The school gradually added more sports in the ensuing years, including men's basketball in 1971 and women's basketball in 1972. The hoops teams mainly played in Curtis Hixon Hall in downtown Tampa until 1980, when the school opened the on-campus USF Sun Dome, now known as Yuengling Center, for use by its basketball and volleyball teams.

USF began a football program in 1997. They played in Tampa Stadium for one season, then moved into newly built Raymond James Stadium the following year. The program competed as an NCAA Division I-AA independent during its first four seasons until 2001, when the Bulls moved up to Division I-A. They joined Conference USA in 2003, switched to the Big East Conference in 2005, and became a charter member of the American Athletic Conference in 2013.

After joining the Big East, the Bulls began a streak of six straight bowl game appearances. The 2007 season was the program's most successful so far, as the team reached as high as #2 in the BCS rankings under coach Jim Leavitt. Charlie Strong became USF's head football coach in 2017.

The Bulls have won six national championships in school history: softball in 1983 and 1984, women's swimming in 1985, and sailing in 2009, 2016, and 2017. Individuals and relay teams have combined to win 21 national championships for USF.

University of Tampa

The University of Tampa has the oldest collegiate sports program in the area, dating to 1933, when the school first fielded a football team. The "Tampa U" Spartans played at Plant Field for three seasons before moving to Phillips Field in 1936. They were the first team to call Tampa Stadium home when it opened in 1967. The Spartans moved up to play NCAA Division I football and produced several NFL stars, before dropping the sport entirely after the 1974 season due to budgetary concerns.

Currently, UT competes at the NCAA Division II level in the Sunshine State Conference (SSC). UT is among the top schools in the SSC in both championships and student-athletes named to the Commissioner's Honor Roll. Spartan teams have won 19 NCAA Division II titles: men's soccer in 1981, 1994 and 2001, women's soccer in 2007, baseball in 1992, 1993, 1998, 2006, 2007, 2013, 2015, and 2019, men's golf in 1987 and 1988, volleyball 2007, 2014, 2018, and 2021, and beach volleyball in 2019. Two individuals have also won national titles. With national championships in 2006 and 2007, the Spartan baseball team became the first team in Division II baseball to win consecutive titles since they did it previously in 1992 and 1993. The school's basketball and volleyball teams have played in the on-campus Bob Martinez Sports Center since 1984.

Saint Leo University
Though Saint Leo was established as a college in 1889 and is much older than any of the other college in the Tampa Bay area, a good portion of their early history was spent as a college preparatory school. The college was re-established in 1959. SLU teams participate as a member of the NCAA's Division II. The Lions are charter members of the Sunshine State Conference. Men's sports include baseball, basketball, cross country, golf, lacrosse, soccer, swimming and tennis; while women's sports include basketball, cross country, golf, lacrosse, soccer, softball, swimming, tennis and volleyball. The baseball team calls Thomas B. Southard Stadium home. The Marion Bowman Center is used for basketball and volleyball. Marion Bowman Aquatics Center hosts the swim team. Soccer, tennis and lacrosse are also played at on-campus facilities. The men's and women's golf teams uses neighboring Lake Jovita Golf & Country Club as their home course.

The men's golf team won the 2016 NCAA Division II title. It is the only team national title for the school, but three athletes have won individual titles at Saint Leo.

The school mascot is a lion named Fritz and the school colors are green and gold. Red Barrett, Jim Corsi, Sankar Montoute, Bob Tewksbury and J. P. Ricciardi are all notable alumni of Saint Leo athletics.

Eckerd College

Eckerd College is a charter member of the Sunshine State Conference (NCAA Division II) fielding 13 athletic teams in coed and women's sailing, men's and women's basketball, men's and women's soccer, baseball, volleyball, men's and women's golf, men's and women's tennis, and softball. The sailing team competes nationally as a member of the SAISA (the South Atlantic Intercollegiate Sailing Association) and is a member of the ICSA (Intercollegiate Sailing Association). The college's basketball and volleyball teams play in the McArthur Center's gymnasium. Eckerd's mascot is the Triton, and the school's colors, teal, navy and black were adopted by the athletic programs in 2005; previously the school's colors had been black, red, and white.

In 2006, for the first time in the 24-year history of the Eckerd College Women's Volleyball program, the Tritons qualified for the NCAA South Region tournament. Notable baseball alumni include Steve Balboni, Bill Evers, Joe Lefebvre and Brian Sabean.

Notable minor league sports
The Tampa Bay area is home to numerous minor league sports teams.

Soccer

The Tampa Bay Rowdies are a member of the USL Championship (USLC), competing in the second tier of the United States soccer pyramid. The franchise considers itself to be a phoenix club of the original Tampa Bay Rowdies of the first NASL and displays a star on its shield commemorating the 1975 championship. Though the owners intended to use the Rowdies name from the beginning, trademark issues forced the team to call itself FC Tampa Bay when it took the pitch as an expansion franchise of the USSF Division 2 Professional League in 2010. The team transitioned into the second NASL for 2011 and obtained the rights to the Rowdies name for 2012. The team moved to the United Soccer League Championship, then known as the United Soccer League, in 2016 as a part of their bid for expansion to the MLS.

The club played its first season in George M. Steinbrenner Field in Tampa before moving to St. Petersburg's Al Lang Stadium for subsequent seasons. In 2012, the Rowdies won the NASL's Soccer Bowl to claim the league championship. They were USL Regular Season champions and Eastern Conference champions in 2020 and were then named league co-champions along with the Phoenix Rising after the title game had to be canceled because of COVID-19. They repeated as Eastern Conference champions in 2021 but lost in the title game.

Florida Tropics SC compete in indoor soccer in the Major Arena Soccer League. Like the Rowdies, they shared the 2020 league title as co-champions with the Monterrey Flash. They won the regular season league title in 2021.

Football 
The Tampa Bay Vipers were announced as one of eight XFL Franchises on December 18, 2018. They played 5 games of the 2020 XFL season until the league got shut down due to COVID-19. The XFL got bought in August 2020 by a group including Dwayne Johnson and announced that the league will be relaunching in 2023.

The Tampa Bay Tornadoes will play in the American Indoor Football Alliance starting in 2022, before which they played in the American Arena League. They were originally scheduled to play their inaugural season in 2020, but it was canceled due to COVID-19. In 2021, the Tornadoes withdrew following their fourth game of the season, compiling a 3–1 record.

The Tampa Bay Bandits were announced as one of eight USFL franchises that would be returning for the leagues 2022 relaunch. They will be playing April 2022.

Basketball
The Tampa Bay Titans play in The Basketball League (TBL).  Their home games are played at Pasco–Hernando State College. The team's owner, Bassel Harfouch, is also the team's leading scorer.

The St. Pete Tide and the Tampa Gunners play in the Florida Basketball Association (FBA).  The Tide's home games are played at St. Petersburg Catholic High School, and the Gunners are a travel team.

The Toronto Raptors of the National Basketball Association (NBA) played all their home games in 2020–21 at Amalie Arena due to travel restrictions brought on by the Canadian government in response to the COVID-19 pandemic hitting Canada, especially with a spike of cases in the Toronto area.

Other minor league sports

Defunct major sports franchises 
Over the years, the Tampa Bay area was home to several professional sports franchises that eventually folded, including many short-lived minor league teams. Major and notable minor sports teams included:

Tampa Bay Rowdies 

The Tampa Bay Rowdies were the first major professional sports team in the area. As such, they were also the first pro franchise to make Tampa Stadium its home field and the first to use "Tampa Bay" in their name. They began play in 1975 as an expansion franchise of the original North American Soccer League (NASL). The Rowdies won the inaugural Soccer Bowl in 1975, bringing Tampa Bay its first professional sports championship, and were successful for most of their existence. The NASL folded in 1984, but the Rowdies continued play in other outdoor and indoor soccer leagues (usually at Tampa Stadium and St. Petersburg's Bayfront Center, respectively) before finally folding in 1993.

A new incarnation of the Tampa Bay Rowdies in the second North American Soccer League took the pitch in 2010. While a licensing dispute forced the franchise to call itself "FC Tampa Bay" for its initial two seasons, the new club used the old club's green and gold color scheme and include a star for the Rowdies' 1975 championship in their team shield The team officially began using the "Rowdies" name for the 2012 season and promptly brought home the Soccer Bowl trophy that October. The current Rowdies now play in the second-tier USL Championship and were eastern conference champions and league co-champions in 2020 after the championship game was canceled due to the COVID-19 pandemic.

Tampa Bay Bandits 

The Tampa Bay Bandits of the United States Football League (USFL) played three seasons in Tampa Stadium from 1983 to 1985. With innovative head coach Steve Spurrier and a fan-friendly atmosphere, "Banditball"'s local popularity rivaled that of the more-established Buccaneers, who were in the midst of a streak of 14 straight losing seasons during the Bandits' short existence.

The USFL decided to compete directly with the NFL in 1986 by moving its season from the spring to the fall. But after the infamous failure of the USFL's antitrust lawsuit against the NFL, the league folded instead. John Bassett, the principal owner of the Bandits, had opposed the USFL's fall strategy and planned to make the team a charter member of a new spring league. However, Bassett's failing health prevented this idea from becoming reality. He died from cancer in 1986, and the Bandits would not play another down.

Tampa Bay Mutiny 

The Tampa Bay Mutiny was a charter franchise of Major League Soccer. They began play at Tampa Stadium in 1996 and were immediately successful, winning the MLS Supporters' Shield in their inaugural season behind MLS MVP Carlos Valderrama and forward Roy Lassiter, whose 27 goals in 1996 stood as the MLS single-season record until 2018.

As the team transitioned into Raymond James Stadium for 1999, however, poor personnel moves (including the loaning away of stars Carlos Valderrama and Roy Lassiter) led to decreased win totals which led to decreased fan support. Unable to find local buyers and hampered by an unfavorable lease agreement for Raymond James Stadium, the league folded the franchise in 2001.

Tampa Bay Storm 

The Tampa Bay Storm played in the Arena Football League. Originally established as the Pittsburgh Gladiators in 1987, the team moved to St. Petersburg and changed their name for the 1991 season. The newly christened Storm won their first ArenaBowl championship in their first season in the Tampa Bay area and won four more over the years, tied for the most titles (5) in AFL history. The Storm's original home turf was Tropicana Field, which was called the "Thunderdome" for a few years in honor of its two main tenants at the time: the Storm and the Tampa Bay Lightning. The Storm followed the Lightning to downtown Tampa in 1997 when they moved their home turf to the Ice Palace.

The Storm had one of the longest associations with their market of any AFL team and enjoyed strong local support, leading the league in attendance many times. In 2011, the franchise was purchased by Tampa Bay Entertainment Properties, the same group that owns the Tampa Bay Lightning and Amalie Arena. The Storm enjoyed continued success for a few more seasons while the AFL as a whole declined, dropping to only five franchises for the 2017 season. In December 2017, the Storm's ownership group announced that due to greatly reduced league revenues, the franchise would cease operations. However, they left open the possibility of reestablishing the Storm in a "stronger, reinvented AFL."

Other defunct teams

Major championship events hosted in Tampa Bay 
Tampa has hosted five Super Bowls. Super Bowl XVIII (1984) and Super Bowl XXV (1991) were held in Tampa Stadium; Super Bowl XXXV (2001), Super Bowl XLIII (2009), and Super Bowl LV (2021) were played in Raymond James Stadium. In Super Bowl LV, the Buccaneers became the first team in NFL history to play a Super Bowl in their home stadium. They defeated the Kansas City Chiefs 31–9 in the game.
Two World Series games were played in St. Petersburg's Tropicana Field in the fall of 2008 when the Tampa Bay Rays hosted the Philadelphia Phillies.
Four Stanley Cup Finals games were played in Tampa's St. Pete Times Forum, now Amalie Arena, late in the spring of 2004 when the Tampa Bay Lightning hosted the Calgary Flames. Three games were hosted in 2015 as the Lightning faced the Chicago Blackhawks, and another three in 2021 when they played the Montreal Canadiens.
 Three NASL indoor soccer championships were hosted by the Tampa Bay Rowdies at the Bayfront Center in St. Petersburg: 1976, 1979–80 and 1981–82.
 Three ArenaBowls were hosted by the Tampa Bay Storm: ArenaBowl IX in 1995 (at Tropicana Field), ArenaBowl XII in 1998, and ArenaBowl XVII in 2003 (both at Amalie Arena).
The 1999 NCAA Division I Men's Final Four was played at Tropicana Field
Amalie Arena hosted the NCAA Division I Women's Final Four in 2008, 2015, and 2019.
The NCAA Division I Men's Soccer Championship final has been played in Tampa on five occasions. It was played at Tampa Stadium in 1978, 1979 and 1980 and played at the USF Soccer Stadium in 1990 and 1991.
The NCAA Division II Men's Soccer Championship final has been played in Tampa on seven occasions, the most for any location. The 1983, 1987, 1992, 1994, and 2001 editions were played on the University of Tampa campus at Pepin-Rood Stadium. The 2008 and 2009 editions were played at its replacement on the same site, Pepin Stadium.
 The 1990 Davis Cup Final was played in St. Petersburg at Tropicana Field, then known as the Florida Suncoast Dome.
The 2009 NCAA Division I Women's Volleyball Final Four was held at Amalie Arena
In 2012 and 2016, Amalie Arena (then Tampa Bay Times Forum) played host to the Men's Frozen Four. To date this is the farthest South the tournament finals have been staged.
The 2015 NCAA Division I Men's Golf Championship and 2015 NCAA Division I Women's Golf Championship were held at the Concession Golf Club and hosted by USF.
In 2012, Al Lang Stadium hosted the second leg of the NASL Championship Series between the Tampa Bay Rowdies and the Minnesota Stars FC.
Raymond James Stadium hosted the 2017 College Football Playoff National Championship.
Tampa Stadium played host to the 1984 USFL Championship Game.
Each spring at Raymond James Stadium hosts the USEF's top 30 ranked equestrians compete at the American Invitational for the sport's largest purse.
The University of Tampa's Bob Martinez Sports Center hosted the 2021 NCAA Division II Women's Volleyball Final Four.
 Tampa will host the 2023 Division I NCAA Women's Volleyball Championship, the 2023 NCAA Division I Men's Frozen Four, the 2025 NCAA Division I Women's Basketball Final Four and the 2026 NCAA Division I Men's Basketball First and Second Rounds, all at Amalie Arena.

Other events
Other notable sporting events in the area include:
The NCAA football Division I FBS Outback Bowl at Raymond James Stadium is held in Tampa each January, usually on New Year's Day
The NCAA football Division I FBS Gasparilla Bowl is also held at Raymond James Stadium, typically in December. It was originally played at Tropicana Field in St. Petersburg under several names before being moved to Tampa in 2018.
 The NCAA football East–West Shrine Game has been held annually at Tropicana Field since 2012.
 The Tampa Bay Derby (Grade II) thoroughbred horse race is held annually in mid March at Tampa Bay Downs near Oldsmar
The USHRA holds an event every January at Raymond James Stadium.
The NTT IndyCar Series Firestone Grand Prix of St. Petersburg is held on a course encompassing the Albert Whitted Airport and streets in the Bayfront area in St. Petersburg. The race has been held in 2003 & 2005–present. Other motorsports events include the SCCA Trans-Am Series, which competed at the Bayfront area from 1985 to 1990, and at a course surrounding Tropicana Field from 1996 to 1997. In 1989 and 1990, IMSA held a race at the Florida State Fairgrounds.
 The 1978 NFL Pro Bowl was held in Tampa at Tampa Stadium.
 The 1999 NHL All Star Game was held in Tampa at Amalie Arena when it was known as the Ice Palace. It was held a second time in 2018.
The 2008 and 2009 ACC Championship Games for football were held at Raymond James Stadium.
 The Tampa Bay Derby (Grade II) thoroughbred horse race is held annually in mid March at Tampa Bay Downs near Oldsmar.
 The NTT IndyCar Series's Firestone Grand Prix of St. Petersburg is held annually during the first weekend of April.
 The USEF's top 30 ranked equestrians compete each spring in the American Invitational for the sport's largest purse in Tampa at Raymond James Stadium.

Current venues

Raymond James Stadium 

Raymond James Stadium is home to the Tampa Bay Buccaneers and the South Florida Bulls football team. The stadium seats 65,618, which can be expanded to about 75,000 for special events with the addition of temporary seating. The stadium has been the site of three Super Bowls: Super Bowl XXXV in 2001, Super Bowl XLIII in 2009, and Super Bowl LV in 2021. Raymond James Stadium is the home of the annual Outback Bowl (since 1999) and Gasparilla Bowl (since 2018) and was the site of the College Football Playoff National Championship in 2017. Raymond James Stadium was also the site of WrestleMania 37 in April 2021.

Amalie Arena 

Amalie Arena is located in downtown Tampa's Channelside District and is home to the Tampa Bay Lightning. Other entertainment events occasionally held in the arena include concerts, NBA exhibition games, USF men's basketball and NCAA men's and women's basketball tournament games, and Frozen Four games.

Tropicana Field 

Tropicana Field is an indoor domed stadium in St. Petersburg that is home to the Tampa Bay Rays. It has also hosted the Tampa Bay Lightning, college football bowl games, WWE ThunderDome, and the 1999 NCAA Division I Men's Basketball Final Four.

Al Lang Stadium 

Al Lang Stadium in St. Petersburg is home to the Tampa Bay Rowdies. It opened in 1947 and was used as a minor league baseball field for most of its history. It is named for a former mayor of St. Pete.

Yuengling Center 

The Yuengling Center (formerly the USF Sun Dome) is an indoor arena on the campus of the University of South Florida. It is currently used by the USF men's basketball team, women's basketball team, and women's volleyball team, as well as other university events. It opened in 1980.

Historical venues

Tampa Stadium 

Tampa Stadium was the first large modern sports venue in the area, holding over 73,000 fans in its final configuration. It was built in 1967 for the University of Tampa Spartans college football program with an eye toward future NFL expansion. "Tampa U" discontinued its football program in 1974, but Tampa Stadium was soon put back to use when the Tampa Bay Rowdies began play in 1975 and the Tampa Bay Buccaneers kicked off in 1976.

In its day, the "Big Sombrero" was also home to the Tampa Bay Bandits of the USFL, the Tampa Bay Mutiny of MLS, and USF Bulls football. It hosted two Super Bowls and a Pro Bowl along with numerous special events and large concerts, such as a 1973 Led Zeppelin concert that broke the all-time record for the largest crowd to see a single artist and a 1977 Led Zeppelin concert that was cut short by a thunderstorm, leading to an audience riot.

Immediately upon buying the Buccaneers in 1995, new owner Malcolm Glazer declared Tampa Stadium inadequate and demanded that a new facility be built at public expense or he would move the team. Local governments acquiesced, raising sales taxes and constructing Raymond James Stadium directly adjacent to Tampa Stadium. The Big Sombrero was demolished in 1998.

Al López Field 

Al López Field was a spring training and minor league ballpark in Tampa situated at the current location of Raymond James Stadium. It was built in 1954 and named after Al López, the Ybor City native who went on become Tampa's first MLB player and, eventually, a Hall of Fame manager. The ballpark was originally the spring training home of the Chicago White Sox. Coincidentally, Al López became the manager of the White Sox in 1957 and spent several spring trainings at a hometown facility named after himself.

The White Sox moved out and the Cincinnati Reds moved in for 1960. The Reds would use Al López Field and the adjacent training facilities (nicknamed "Redsland") as their spring home for almost 30 years. The Tampa Tarpons, the Reds' Class-A team, played in the ballpark during the summer, and several members of Cincinnati's championship-winning "Big Red Machine" such as Pete Rose. Johnny Bench, and Dave Concepción played some of their first professional baseball in Tampa.

The Reds moved to new facilities in nearby Plant City for spring training 1988. The Tarpons played one more season in the ballpark before it was torn down in 1989. To honor its still-living namesake, the city of Tampa changed the name of a nearby park from "Horizon Park" to "Al López Park".

Plant Field 

Plant Field was the first large spectator sports facility in the area. It was built in 1889 by Henry B. Plant across the Hillsborough River from Tampa as part of his Tampa Bay Hotel resort. As the only facility of its kind in Central Florida, Plant Field hosted a wide variety of events, including auto and horse racing; pro, college, and high school football; and large political events. It was also the long-time location of the Florida State Fair, and the route of the Gasparilla parade would end on Plant Field's track while the fair was in session.

Plant Field was the original home of the minor league Tampa Smokers, the area's first professional baseball team, and was one of the first spring training sites in Florida, hosting several different teams over the decades. During one of the earliest ballgames in April 1919, Babe Ruth reportedly hit his longest home run – a 587-foot blast that is memorialized with a historical marker at the approximate spot where it landed at the current site of the University of Tampa's school of business.

The University of Tampa took over Plant Field in the early 1970s and renamed it Peppin-Rood Stadium after university benefactors. Since then, the school has built new facilities on its huge footprint, including a soccer field (Peppin Stadium), softball and baseball fields, dormitories, and other academic and athletic facilities. While some of the original playing surface is still in use as part of newer venues, the last remaining portions of Plant Field's old grandstand was torn down in 2002.

Phillips Field 

Phillips Field was a medium-sized stadium (maximum capacity approximately 20,000) located just north of Plant Field between Cass Street and the current location of Interstate 275 on the west bank of the Hillsborough River. It served as the home for the University of Tampa's football team from 1936 to 1967 and was named after I. W. Phillips, a local businessman who donated the land to the school so that the Spartans would not have to share Plant Field.

Besides "Tampa U" home games, Phillips Field occasionally hosted other football contests. It was the site of the Cigar Bowl, the area's first college bowl game, from 1946 to 1954, and the Florida Gators scheduled several home games at the facility during the 1930s and 1940s. Phillips Field was also the site of several well-attended NFL preseason contests in the mid-1960s that helped Tampa earn an eventual expansion franchise. And local high school rivalry games which attracted crowds too large for the participants' smaller stadiums were played in Phillips Field until the late 1960s, when newly built Tampa Stadium took over that role.

Phillips Field could also be configured for baseball, and the Tampa Smokers of the Class C Florida International League played most of their home games there from 1946 to 1954.

When Tampa Stadium was completed in 1967, the city gave Plant Field to the University of Tampa, and Phillips Field fell into disuse. It was razed in the early 1970s, and Tampa Preparatory School and Julian Lane Riverfront Park were built at its former location.

Curtis Hixon Hall 

Curtis Hixon Hall was a multipurpose facility built in 1965 on the banks of the Hillsborough River in downtown Tampa. Along with many concerts. conventions, and special events, Curtis Hixon Hall hosted many professional and amateur boxing and wrestling cards and served as the first home of the University of South Florida's basketball programs and a series of minor league basketball teams.

Curtis Hixon Hall was made obsolete by the construction of newer and larger facilities such as the Ice Palace (now the Amalie Arena), the Sun Dome, and the Tampa Convention Center. It was demolished in 1993 and replaced with Curtis Hixon Park. In 2010, a new Tampa Museum of Art and the Glazer Children's Museum opened on the site of the old hall, while a redesigned Curtis Hixon Waterfront Park debuted in adjacent open space.

Bayfront Center 

The Bayfront Center (also known as the Bayfront Arena) was a multipurpose facility along the shores of Tampa Bay near downtown St. Petersburg. Though a little larger than Tampa's Curtis Hixon Hall, it was built in the same year (1965) and hosted a similar mix of concerts, sports, and special events. The Tampa Bay Rowdies played most of their home indoor soccer matches in the facility during the 1980s, and a handful of minor league basketball and hockey teams also called it home. Several nationally televised wrestling and boxing events were held there, along with annual Ringling Bros. and Barnum & Bailey Circus TV specials. The Bayfront Center also hosted some USF men's basketball games throughout the 1970s.

See also
 Sports in Florida

References

 
History of Tampa, Florida